Hans Peter Wallfisch (20 October 1924 – 10 November 1993) was a concert pianist and teacher, resident in Britain from 1951.

Life
Wallfisch was born in Breslau, Lower Silesia, in 1924. In 1938 he emigrated to Palestine; he studied at the Jerusalem Conservatoire, and was later a teacher there. In the late 1940s, he studied in Paris with Marguerite Long. In 1948, he won the first prize of the Béla Bartók Competition in Budapest.

In 1951 he moved to Britain, and in 1952 he married the cellist Anita Lasker; they had a son, the cellist Raphael Wallfisch, and a daughter.

He performed in Europe and elsewhere. As well as the classics, he was interested in lesser-known music of different nations; among English composers he was particularly interested in the music of Frank Bridge, and also of Kenneth Leighton, who dedicated compositions to him.

From 1973 until 1991 Wallfisch was professor of piano at the Royal College of Music. In that year he suffered a stroke which affected his ability to play, and ceased performing in public. He died in London in 1993.

References

1924 births
1993 deaths
Musicians from Wrocław
20th-century classical pianists
Academics of the Royal College of Music
German emigrants to Mandatory Palestine
Mandatory Palestine expatriates in France
Israeli emigrants to the United Kingdom